Philip Powell Calvert (January 29, 1871 – August 23, 1961) was an American entomologist, recognised as a leading authority on the Odonata (dragonfly order). 

A long term teacher and professor at the University of Pennsylvania, he was President of the American Entomological Society 1900-15. His 1893 publication Catalogue of the Odonata (dragonflies) of the Vicinity of Philadelphia, with an Introduction to the Study of this Group served as a model for regional insect study and was the first major attempt at a guide to the order. Calvert went on to publish over 300 notes and articles on the Odonata.  He was married to botanist Amelia Smith Calvert.

External links 
 
Philip Powell Calvert: Student, Teacher, and Odonatologist

Odonata. Calvert's contribution to the Biologia Centrali-Americana

American entomologists
1871 births
1961 deaths
19th-century American zoologists
Odonatologists